Paynton is a village in the Canadian province of Saskatchewan within the Rural Municipality of Paynton No. 470 and Census Division No. 17. It is the administrative centre of the Little Pine Cree First Nation band government.

History 
Paynton incorporated as a village on May 2, 1907.

Demographics 

Climate

See also 
 List of communities in Saskatchewan
 Villages of Saskatchewan

References

Villages in Saskatchewan
Paynton No. 470, Saskatchewan
Division No. 17, Saskatchewan